Seinäjoen Jalkapallokerho (or SJK Seinäjoki or SJK) is a Finnish professional football club from the city of Seinäjoki. The club plays in the Veikkausliiga, the highest tier of the Finnish league system. Their home ground is OmaSP Stadion, which is located near the city center and next to SJK's training facility Wallsport. SJK was formed in 2007 after the merger of TP-Seinäjoki and Sepsi-78.

History

The early years
SJK was formed on 5 November 2007 as a merger between the first teams of TP-Seinäjoki and Sepsi-78. It was told to the public five days later. Sepsi-78 had a board meeting on 24 October and TP-Seinäjoki on the next day. Both clubs supported the merger. Sepsi-78 and TP both gave up their place in Kakkonen. The first signing of the new club was Petri Huttu. There were several negotiations about the merger over the years. The main reason was the inadequacy of players. The clubs continued doing junior work after the merger, but could also have their own team in the lower divisions. The work name of the club was Seinäjoki Futis, and there was a contest about the official name, where everyone could suggest a name. The final name was Seinäjoen Jalkapallokerho, that had been suggested by many people. There was also a contest about the logo and uniform. The registered name of the club is Seinäjoen Jalkapallokerho ry, and it was registered on January 22, 2008. Mikko Latomäki was chosen as the first chairman. Jukka Saarijärvi was chosen as the vice chairman. Saarijärvi was a former TP-Seinäjoki chairman.

Promotion to Veikkausliiga
In 2013 SJK started its second season in Ykkönen. In 2012 SJK had been placed second. SJK made some signings for 2013, which included a Spanish La Masia  graduate Josu and Estonian Mihkel Aksalu. SJK started the season on May 4 with a 2–1 win over PK-35 Vantaa. SJK played AC Kajaani on June 30 and won 1–7. Kajaani made a complaint to Palloliitto about the amount of foreigners in SJK. The complaint went through and AC Kajaani was changed as the winner of the match. SJK complained about the decision and the result was again changed. AC Kajaani complained again, but later canceled it. After that SJK lost five matches in a row. SJK however did win eight matches in a row after that. The promotion to Veikkausliiga was confirmed on 29 September 2013 in a homematch against FC Haka. There was a record breaking attendance (4 798). The match was a 1–1 draw.

SJK started the season 2014 with winning the League Cup. SJK won the final 2–0 against local rivals Vaasan Palloseura. The season started poorly, at the end of May the club was at the eleventh place. After that SJK won seven games in a row and those results lifted SJK to the second place. HJK won the league and SJK was second. SJK was the only club to win against HJK under Mika Lehkosuo. SJK lost only two of the last 24 games. The most important players were Mihkel Aksalu, the league's best defender Cedric Gogoua, Johannes Laaksonen and Toni Lehtinen.

For the 2015 season SJK got even stronger. There were new signings like Mehmet Hetemaj and Ariel Ngueukam. SJK was considered as the biggest challenger of HJK. SJK was at the top of the table in September. SJK won HJK 3–0 in Seinäjoki. At the end of the season SJK's biggest challenger was Rovaniemen Palloseura. SJK won the league with one point difference to RoPS. The most important players were Roope Riski and Liverpool FC loanee Allan. SJK was chosen as the team of the year in Finland's sports gala.

SJK won the Finnish Cup in 2016. It was the first time in the club's history.

SJK's head coach Simo Valakari was surprisingly sacked on February 17, 2017. He was replaced by Sixten Boström. Sixten Boström got also sacked after poor results in May and was replaced by Spanish José Manuel Roca Roca was sacked in September. SJK Akatemia coaches Brian Page and Toni Lehtinen did the job for the rest of the poor season. Under Page and Lehtinen SJK lost the Finnish Cup final to HJK. Tommi Kautonen was hired as the new head coach in October 2017. The season 2018 didn't start as planned and Kautonen was sacked. He was replaced by Aleksei Borisovich Yeryomenko. Yeryomenko could save SJK from relegation. Yeryomenko continued as the head coach in 2019. SJK signed for example Sergei Eremenko and Moshtagh Yaghoubi. SJK didn't win a single game in the group stage of the Finnish Cup in the winter. The Veikkausliiga-campaign started well, because SJK won in the first round for the first time ever. SJK won KPV in the end of April and was at the first place of the league. Despite the good start, SJK couldn't get good results. Yeryomenko was sacked in August. The replacement was Brian Page. SJK didn't win any games for the rest of the season. SJK placed ninth.

After the season SJK appointed Jani Honkavaara as the new head coach. Honkavaara signed many prolific players for the 2020 season, such as Ariel Ngueukam, Robin Sid, Tero Mäntylä and Niko Markkula. In the winter, SJK once again could not get through from the group stage of the Finnish Cup. As the Veikkausliiga season started in July, SJK won in the first round against TPS. SJK had a good start to the season, but the results started to get worse quite quickly. In the summer transfer window the club signed a couple of players, such as Jake Jervis and Emmanuel Ledesma. They proved themselves quickly and with their lead SJK could end the season somewhat brightly. SJK finished seventh, which was disappointing for the club and the supporters.

Domestic history

European history

Accurate as of 28 July 2022

Legend: GF = Goals For. GA = Goals Against. GD = Goal Difference.

Notes
 1Q: First qualifying round
 2Q: Second qualifying round

Stadium and sponsors

Stadium

SJK play their home matches at OmaSP Stadion. Previously SJK played their home matches at Seinäjoen keskuskenttä.

In 2010, it was reported for the first time that SJK were planning a new football stadium. Eventually, in autumn 2014 it was announced that the construction of SJK's new stadium would start soon. The construction began in summer 2015 and the new stadium was completed in June 2016. Stadium has a capacity of 5817 seats.

SJK play their friendlies and cup matches during the winter at Wallsport Areena which is an indoor training facility owned and operated by the team.

Kit suppliers and shirt sponsors

Honours
Veikkausliiga
  Winners (1): 2015
  Runners-up (1): 2014
  3rd place (2): 2016, 2021
Finnish Cup
  Winners (1): 2016
  Runners-up (1): 2017 
Finnish League Cup
  Winners (1): 2014
  Runners-up (1): 2016

Current squad

Out on loan

Management and boardroom

Management
As of 19 December 2022

Boardroom
As of 19 February 2021

SJK Akatemia

SJK Akatemia contains two teams: SJK U17 and SJK U23 which is the reserve team of SJK. SJK's reserve team currently plays in Ykkönen (the second highest league in Finland). The teams are coached by Brian Page and Arttu Aromaa. In 2018 SJK started a football high school with Kuortane sports school. It produces young players to SJK and SJK Akatemia.

Records and notable stats

Club Records

 Biggest home win: SJK 8-1 TUS (30 May 2008)
 Biggest away win: VPS-j 0–7 SJK (7 September 2008)
 Biggest home loss: SJK 0–6 HJK (10 August 2017)
 Biggest away loss: HJK 6-0 SJK (31 May 2017)
 Most consecutive matches without lost: 44 (18 August 2010 – 30 May 2012)
 Most consecutive wins: 9 (11 July 2011 – 27 August 2011)
 Most consecutive losses: 5 (8 April 2022 - 7 May 2022)

Individual Records

 Most appearances:  Mihkel Aksalu (221)
 Most goals:  Toni Lehtinen (39)
 Most league appearances:  Mihkel Aksalu (158)
 Most league goals:  Ariel Ngueukam (26)
 Most cup appearances:  Mehmet Hetemaj (33)
 Most cup goals:  Mehmet Hetemaj (7)
 Most European competition appearances:  Mehmet Hetemaj (10)
 Most European competition goals:  Jake Jervis (3)
 Most capped Finnish player:  Alexei Eremenko - 61 caps
 Most capped foreign player:  Tarmo Kink - 83 caps

Most appearances

Club captains

Supporters player of the year

SJK All Stars
In April 2020, SJK fans participated in a fan vote selecting their 11 favourite SJK players from the 2014-2019-seasons.

Managers

References

External links
 

 
Football clubs in Finland
Seinäjoki
2007 establishments in Finland
Association football clubs established in 2007